The 1980 United States House of Representatives elections in South Carolina were held on November 4, 1980 to select six Representatives for two-year terms from the state of South Carolina.  The primary elections for the Democrats and the Republicans were held on June 10 and the runoff elections were held two weeks later on June 24.  Three incumbents were re-elected, but John Jenrette of the 6th congressional district was defeated in his bid for re-election and the open seat in the 1st congressional district was taken by the Republicans from the Democrats.  The composition of the state delegation after the elections was four Republicans and two Democrats.

1st congressional district
Incumbent Democratic Congressman Mendel Jackson Davis of the 1st congressional district, in office since 1971, opted to retire.  Tommy Hartnett, a Republican state senator from Charleston, defeated Thomas G. Moore in the Republican primary and Democrat Charles D. Ravenel in the general election.

Democratic primary

Republican primary

General election results

|-
| 
| colspan=5 |Republican gain from Democratic
|-

2nd congressional district
Incumbent Republican Congressman Floyd Spence of the 2nd congressional district, in office since 1971, defeated Democratic challenger Tom Turnipseed.

Democratic primary

General election results

|-
| 
| colspan=5 |Republican hold
|-

3rd congressional district
Incumbent Democratic Congressman Butler Derrick of the 3rd congressional district, in office since 1975, defeated Republican challenger Marshall Parker.

General election results

|-
| 
| colspan=5 |Democratic hold
|-

4th congressional district
Incumbent Republican Congressman Carroll A. Campbell, Jr. of the 4th congressional district, in office since 1979, defeated Libertarian challenger Thomas P. Waldenfels.

General election results

|-
| 
| colspan=5 |Republican hold
|-

5th congressional district
Incumbent Democratic Congressman Kenneth Lamar Holland of the 5th congressional district, in office since 1975, defeated Libertarian challenger Thomas Campbell.

General election results

|-
| 
| colspan=5 |Democratic hold
|-

6th congressional district
Incumbent Democratic Congressman John Jenrette of the 6th congressional district, in office since 1975, was defeated in his bid for re-election by Republican John Light Napier.

Democratic primary

Republican primary

General election results

|-
| 
| colspan=5 |Republican gain from Democratic
|-

See also
United States House elections, 1980
United States Senate election in South Carolina, 1980
South Carolina's congressional districts

1980
United States House of Representatives elections
South Carolina